Cordelia Chávez Candelaria (born September 14, 1943) is an American educator and writer of Hispanic descent.

The daughter of  Ray J. Chávez and Eloida Trujillo, she was born in Deming, New Mexico  and studied English and French at Fort Lewis College. She next received an MA in English and a PhD in American literature and structural linguistics from the University of Notre Dame. From 1975 to 1978, Candelaria was associate professor of English and Chicano literature at Idaho State University. She was program officer for the Division of Research at the National Endowment for the Humanities from 1976 to 1977. From 1978 to 1991, she was an associate professor of English and head of the Chicano Studies Program at the University of Colorado Boulder; she was also founding director of the Center for the Study of Ethnicity and Race in America there. In 1991, she became an American literature professor and research associate at the Hispanic Research Center of Arizona State University. From 2001 to 2005, she was chair of the Department of Chicana and Chicano Studies. In 2008, she was named dean of the Dedman College of Humanities and Sciences at Southern Methodist University; she resigned from the position of dean in May the following year "for personal reasons".

In 1984, she published her first collection of poetry Ojo de la Cueva (Cave Springs). She was executive editor for the Encyclopedia of Latino Popular Culture. She has also published literary criticism in various literary journals.

In 1961, she married  José Fidel Candelaria. She later married Ronald Beveridge.

She received the Thomas Jefferson Award in 1983, the Colorado University Equity and Excellence Faculty Award in 1989 and a 15-year Higher Education Replication Study award in 1991 from the National Sponsoring Committee in Boulder. In 2005, she received the Outstanding Latino/a Cultural Award in Literary Arts or Publications.

Candelaria was script co-editor and consultant for the 1982 film The Ballad of Gregorio Cortez. She was script consultant for The Milagro Beanfield War.

Selected works 
 Chicano Poetry: A Critical Introduction (1986)
 Seeking the Perfect Game: Baseball in American literature (1989)
 Arroyo to the Heart, poetry (1993)

References 

1943 births
Living people
American women poets
American academics of English literature
Hispanic and Latino American poets
Fort Lewis College alumni
Notre Dame College of Arts and Letters alumni
University of Colorado Boulder faculty
Arizona State University faculty
Idaho State University faculty
People from Deming, New Mexico
American women non-fiction writers
American women academics
21st-century American women